Akaji can refer to the following:

 Akaji Station, railway station in Kotake, Fukuoka, Japan
 Akaji Maro, Japanese actor
 Bumpei Akaji, Hawaiian sculptor